Gruffudd Llwyd (fl. c.1380–1410) was a Welsh language poet.

Gruffudd was the nephew of the poet Hywel ab Einion Lygliw and the bardic tutor of Rhys Goch Eryri.

Gruffudd composed poems on themes of love and religion.  His surviving work is characterised with the anti-English sentiment leading up to the rebellion led by Owain Glyndŵr.

References 
Henry Lewis, Thomas Roberts ac Ifor Williams (ed.), Cywyddau Iolo Goch ac Eraill, 1350-1450 (Bangor, 1925; Cardiff, 1937)
 Rhiannon Ifans (ed.), Gwaith Gruffudd Llwyd a'r Llygliwiaid eraill (University of Wales, 2000)

Welsh-language poets
14th-century Welsh poets
15th-century Welsh poets
Year of birth uncertain
1410 deaths